Cassey is a feminine given name and a surname, as well as a place name. Cassey may refer to:

People with the given name Cassey 
 Cassey Eggelton (born 1952), Cook Islands former politician
 Cassey Ho (born 1987), American social media fitness entrepreneur

People with the middle name Cassey 
 Joseph Cassey Bustill (1822–1895), African-American conductor in the Underground Railroad

People with the surname Cassey 
 Amy Matilda Cassey (1809–1856), African-American abolitionist
 Joseph Cassey (1789–1848) African-American abolitionist and businessman
 Peter William Cassey (1831–1917), African-American 19th-century school founder, minister, and abolitionist.

Other uses 
 Cassey Compton, hamlet in Withington, Gloucestershire
 Cassey House, historic home located in Society Hill neighborhood, Philadelphia, Pennsylvania

See also 
 Cassie, name list